The Butterfly Dance is a 1998 American short mystery drama film, written and directed by Max Reynal, and starring Vera Farmiga, Phil Kauffmann, and Reade Kelly. The film premiered at the WorldFest-Houston International Film Festival on May 15, 1998, where it won the Gold Remi Award for Best Dramatic Short. It then later screened at the Rhode Island International Film Festival.

Plot
A freaky gardener. A scared young woman. A ghost. Things get a little strange as their small suburban lives go bump in the night.

Cast
 Vera Farmiga as Diane
 Phil Kauffmann as Gabriel
 Reade Kelly as Father

Accolades

References

External links
 

1998 short films
1998 films
American drama short films
American mystery drama films
1990s mystery drama films
1998 drama films
1990s English-language films
1990s American films